Ilesanmi is both a surname and a given name of Yoruba origin. It may refer to:

Surname:
Femi Ilesanmi (born 1991), English footballer
Emmanuel Ilesanmi (born 2004), English footballer

Given name:
Ilesanmi Adesida (born 1949), American physicist

References

Yoruba given names
Yoruba-language surnames